The following teams and players took part in the women's volleyball tournament at the 1988 Summer Olympics, in Seoul.

Rosters

Kerly Santos
 Ana Moser
 Vera Mossa
 Eliani da Costa
 Ana Richa
 Maria Trade
 Ana Cláudia Ramos
 Márcia Cunha
 Ana Lúcia Barros
 Sandra Suruagy
 Fernanda Venturini
 Simone Storm
Head coach
 Jorge Araújo

Li Guojun
 Zhao Hong
 Hou Yuzhu
 Wang Yajun
 Yang Xilan
 Su Huijuan
 Jiang Ying
 Cui Yongmei
 Yang Xiaojun
 Zheng Meizhu
 Wu Dan
 Li Yueming
Head coach
 Li Yaoxian

Steffi Schmidt
 Susanne Lahme
 Monika Beu
 Ariane Radfan
 Kathrin Langschwager
 Maike Arlt
 Brit Wiedemann
 Ute Steppin
 Grit Jensen
 Dörte Stüdemann
 Heike Jensen
 Ute Langenau
Head coach
 Siegfried Köhler

Yumi Maruyama
 Kayoko Sugiyama
 Reiko Takizawa
 Miyako Yamashita
 Akemi Sugiyama
 Ichiko Sato
 Norie Hiro
 Kumi Nakada
 Yukari Kawase
 Motoko Obayashi
 Yukiko Takahashi
 Sachiko Fujita
Head coach
 Noriyuki Muneuchi

Katherine Horny
 Cenaida Uribe
 Rosa García
 Miriam Gallardo
 Gaby Pérez
 Sonia Heredia
 Cecilia Tait
 Luisa Cervera
 Denisse Fajardo
 Alejandra de la Guerra
 Gina Torrealva
 Natalia Málaga
Head coach
 Park Man-Bok

Park Mi-Hee
 Kim Gyeong-hui
 Kim Gwi-sun
 Im Hye-suk
 Yu Yeong-mi
 Nam Sun-ok
 Yun Jeong-hye
 Park Bog-ye
 Kim Yun-hye
 Sun Mi-sook
 Mun Seon-hui
 Ji Gyeong-hui
Head coach
 Hwang Sung-On

Valentina Ogiyenko
 Yelena Volkova
 Marina Kumysh
 Irina Smirnova
 Tatyana Sidorenko
 Irina Parkhomchuk
 Tatyana Kraynova
 Olga Shkurnova
 Marina Nikulina
 Yelena Ovchinnikova
 Olga Krivosheyeva
 Svetlana Korytova
Head coach
 Nikolay Karpol

Melissa McLinden
 Angela Rock
 Liz Masakayan
 Kim Oden
 Kimberly Ruddins
 Caren Kemner
 Tammy Webb
 Deitre Collins
 Laurel Kessel
 Prikeba Phipps
 Liane Sato
 Jayne McHugh
Head coach
 Terry Liskevych

References

1988